The 1896 Louisiana gubernatorial election was held on April 21, 1896. Like most Southern states between Reconstruction and the civil rights era, Louisiana's Republican Party was virtually nonexistent in terms of electoral support. As Louisiana had not yet adopted party primaries, this meant that the Democratic Party convention nomination vote was supposed to be the real contest over who would be governor. However, the Republicans and Populists put forward a joint candidate, John N. Pharr. With combined Republican and Populist support Pharr garnered 43% of the vote, although the Democratic nominee, Murphy J. Foster was elected with 57% of the vote.

Results  

General Election, April 17

References

1896
Louisiana
Gubernatorial
April 1896 events